Ladera (from Spanish ladera 'hillside') may refer to:

Places

 Ladera, California, in San Mateo County
 Ladera Heights, California in Los Angeles County
 Ladera Ranch, California in Orange County
 Neighorhoods in various cities called (La) Ladera:
 in Mexico City: List of neighborhoods in Mexico City
 in Chapa de Mota, State of Mexico, Mexico
 in Santa Ana Maya, 	Michoacán, Mexico
 in Ayotlán, Jalisco, Mexico
 in Ocozocoautla de Espinosa, Chiapas, Mexico
 in Medellín, Colombia
 León de Greiff Library, also known as La Ladera Parque Biblioteca
 La cárcel celular de La Ladera, a former prison

People

 Julián Ladera, Venezuelan professional baseball player
 Ladera, a character in the 1995 film Galaxis

Other

 Ladera, a category of dishes in Ottoman cuisine made with olive oil
 Ladera Sandstone, a geologic formation in California
 Battle of La Ladera, Colombia, 1828